is a video game developed by Nintendo and Intelligent Systems and published by Nintendo for the Super Nintendo Entertainment System in 1992. It is packaged with the Super NES Mouse peripheral.

Paint it 
According to the manual, two parts of Mario Paint are meant to familiarize the user with the SNES mouse: the title screen, where users can click on each of the logo text for "surprise[s]" to occur and a fly-swatting mini-game named Gnat Attack, where the player swats 100 insects before fighting a boss named King Watinga. The mini-game has three levels, and after they are completed, the game starts over with the enemies swarming in and attacking at faster speed. Content creation features of the program include a drawing board, "Animation Land", a music composition feature, and a coloring book. Collages can be saved at a time in the program to be loaded at later usage of the software or recorded to VCR. In the coloring book, the user can color-in and edit four pre-made black-and-white drawings, including one featuring Yoshi and Mario, another featuring various animals, a greeting card, and an underwater scene.

The "drawing board" feature is where original paintings can be created. A user can choose from 15 colors and 75 patterns. After choosing, the user can draw with a pen (small, medium, or large) and airbrush;  fill in a closed area the selected texture with the "paint brush" tool; and create perfectly-straight lines, rectangles, and circles that is the color or pattern (either fully colored-in, with just an outline, or with a spray-canned outline). Parts of a drawing can be copied, pasted, and moved to other areas, rotated vertically and horizontally, or erased via pens of six various sizes. An entire painting can also be erased via nine unique visual effects. Animation Land involves the use of these tools for creating four, six, and/or nine-frame animations. Elements of one frame can be copied to others for smooth animations to be created. If a character is being animated, the animation box can be set on a background and move throughout it in a "path" recorded by using the mouse in the "path lever" feature.

In the animation and drawing features, stamps can be added to each painting and frame, which 120 existing ones included in the software. There is a stamp editor that, via a large tile grid, allows the user to create new stamps or edit existing ones, with the same 15 colors for the drawing section usable in the stamp editor. Up to 15 user-made stamps can be saved to a "personal stamp database." There are also text stamps, such as English, Hiragana, Katakana, and Kanji characters, that can be added and changed in size and color.

The music composition tool allows users to write pieces either in common time or triple time. There are 15 instruments samples to use that are notated with different icons, including eight melodic sounds (a piano represented by Mario's head, a bell sound represented by a power star, a trumpet represented by a fire flower, a Game Boy sound represented by an icon of the handheld console, a horn section sample represented by a goose, a guitar sound represented by a jet, and an organ represented by a car), three percussion sounds (a bass drum represented by a mushroom, a wooden block represented by a ship, and a bass pluck represented by a heart), and five sound effects of Yoshi's zip, a dog bark, a cat meow, a pig oink, and a baby hiccup. The icons are added to a treble clef, and notes that can be added are limited to a range from the B below middle C to high G. Additionally, since no flats or sharps can be added, pieces are restricted to notes of the C Major/A Minor scale. Other limitations include composing only in quarter notes, a maximum number of three notes on a beat, and a maximum number of measures a song can last (for 4/4 songs, it's 24 bars, and for 3/4 songs, it's 32). Pieces made in the composition tool can be played in the animation and coloring book modes.

Reception

Contemporaneous 
The Mario Paint and Mouse package sold more than  units by March 1993. Mario Paint is one of the best selling Super NES games at 2.3 million copies.

Mario Paints possible age appeal and amount of features were discussed in reviews. While Nintendo Power and GamePro suggested that it had enough features and interactive elements to fascinate a person of any age with "even a remote interest" in artistic ventures, other reviews, even from critics who enjoyed the program, suggested the program's limitations made its novelty wear thin to those past its young target demographic and made its high price tag unjustifiable. Total!s Steve 'Misery argued that the limitations were inexcusable for a title on a console that can have 250 colors on a screen at a time, stereo audio, and have a ton of graphics change in a instant. Additionally, he was annoyed that the program "goes completely overboard in one area, and then misses others out completely," such as the lack of a zoom feature despite there being eight flashy ways to erase a painting.

Criticisms of the program brought up in reviews include long save times, "impossible" fine detailing, and the fact that only one collage can be saved at a time.

Mario Paint was honored by the Parents' Choice Award, a non-profit organization recognizing children's educational entertainment. The game also received a platinum award at the 1994 Oppenheim Toy Portfolio Awards. Nintendo Power rated Mario Paint the fourth best SNES game of 1992.

Retrospective 

Calling Mario Paint "perhaps the most ingenious and inspired idea Nintendo ever came up with for a product", AllGame rated it 5 out of 5 stars. Honest Gamers stated, "It has very little flaws, if any, is very addictive, and even a child can use it. The games never get old and none of it ever gets tedious. It is one of the best games for the SNES." Josh Despain of Defunct Games, however, opined that while it was a "bold and unconventional move" for Nintendo to release a Mario product that wasn't a game, thus being a "unique piece of video game history," it was nothing more than just another "simplistic" paint program, only with a Mario theme.

In 2006, it was rated the 162nd best game made on a Nintendo system in Nintendo Power'''s Top 200 Games list. In 2014, IGN ranked it as the 105th best Nintendo game in its list of "The Top 125 Nintendo Games of All Time". IGN editor Peer Schneider cited the game's "smart and playful interface" as a "game changer" and commented that "It effectively erased the barriers between creating and playing, making it one of the most memorable and unique games to ever be released on a console." In 2018, Complex listed Mario Paint 35th on their "The Best Super Nintendo Games of All Time." IGN rated the Mario Paint 22nd on its "Top 100 SNES Games of All Time." They noted that the game inspired different variations of popular songs.US Gamer calls Mario Paint "an era-appropriate solution to graphics programs on expensive PCs" which is "at least somewhat responsible for our modern era of 2D indie throwback games". It says, "Every single element ... is engineered to make the act of creation fun in and of itself, even if you're just aimlessly doodling."

Legacy

In video games
Prominent video game developers have cited Mario Paint as an inspiration. Masahito Hatakeyama, one of the designers of 2009's WarioWare D.I.Y. for Nintendo DS, cites Mario Paints drawing and music creation tools as inspiration for the drawing and music creation tools in D.I.Y., while several staff members of the development team cited it as the game that taught them the joy of developing video games.  WarioWare D.I.Y. allows players to record notes via the DS microphone, and apply noises and animals sounds to them, similar to Mario Paint's music creation. WarioWare D.I.Y. uses a paint program based upon the idea of Mario Paint when the player makes a comic or graphics for their custom microgame. When "Mario Paint" is entered as the name for a microgame or comic, the Mario Paint theme will play. Some of Mario Paints sound effects and musical instruments appear in this game.

Another counterpart appears in 2004's WarioWare: Touched! as Wario Paint, allowing the player to use the Nintendo DS stylus to color various characters in the game. "Totaka's Song" can be played with the toy Turntable in the Toy Room. The fly-swatting game makes an additional appearance in the preceding game, WarioWare, Inc.: Mega Microgame$. The Wii Photo Channel features editing functionality similar to Mario Paint, and includes several of the special erasers.

Takashi Tezuka, producer of Super Mario Maker for Wii U, stated that he "was inspired to bring the fun of Mario Paint into this course editor to make something fun and creative for people to enjoy". It includes the interactive title screen Easter eggs and the fly swatting minigame. US Gamer called Mario Paint an essential part of "the road to Super Mario Maker".

A member of the sound staff of Mario Paint, Hirokazu Tanaka, later worked on EarthBound, where some of Mario Paints sound effects and instrument patches appear.

A remixed Mario Paint song medley can be played in the Miiverse stage in Super Smash Bros. for Wii U.

In film
The first episode of Homestar Runner in 1996 was animated using Mario Paint.  A primitive introduction video made with Mario Paint can be found in the museum of the site. A later short in the series, "Strong Bad is a Bad Guy", was made using Mario Paint.

 Composer 
Since the early 2010s, there has been an online culture of users on forums, Discord, and YouTube creating original songs and covers with not only Mario Paints composition feature but also programs replicating it, including Mario Paint Composer, Advanced Mario Sequencer, and Super Mario Paint. Mario Paint covers that have garnered coverage from the press included jeonghoon95's rendition of Daft Punk's "Get Lucky" a cover of Nicholas Britell's theme for the HBO series Succession (2018–present), and axelrod777's cover of the Bob-omb Battlefield level music of Super Mario 64 (1996).

Successors
A downloadable version was released in Japan via the Satellaview broadcast service in 1997. Titled , this version was modified to use a standard controller without the need of a mouse.

A sequel to Mario Paint was titled Mario Paint 64 in development, and then released in 1999 as the Japan-exclusive launch game Mario Artist for the 64DD. Nintendo had commissioned the joint developer Software Creations, who described the game's original 1995 design idea as "a sequel to Mario Paint in 3D for the N64". Paint Studio has been described by IGN and Nintendo World Report, respectively, as being Mario Paint "direct follow-up" and "spiritual successor". Likewise bundled with its system's mouse, Paint Studio includes minigames such as a fly swatting game reminiscent of that in Mario Paint.

See alsoWarioWare D.I.Y.Art Alive!Art AcademyGame Boy CameraFun 'n GamesMario ArtistSuper Mario MakerSuper Mario Maker 2Sound FantasyKid PixWarner Bros.'s  ACME Animation Factory''

Notes

References

Citations

Bibliography

External links
  

1992 video games
Drawing video games
Intelligent Systems games
Nintendo Research & Development 1 games
Raster graphics editors
Super Nintendo Entertainment System-only games
Video games about insects
Video games developed in Japan
Video games scored by Hirokazu Tanaka
Video games scored by Kazumi Totaka
Single-player video games
Paint